The Shenzhen Longhua Open is a tournament for professional female and male tennis players played on outdoor hard courts. The event is classified as a $100,000 ITF Women's Circuit tournament and a $75,000+H ATP Challenger Tour tournament, and has been held in Shenzhen, China, since 2016.

Past finals

Men's singles

Women's singles

Men's doubles

Women's doubles

External links 
 ITF search

ITF Women's World Tennis Tour
ATP Challenger Tour
Hard court tennis tournaments
Tennis tournaments in China
Recurring sporting events established in 2016
2016 establishments in China
Sport in Shenzhen
Sports competitions in Guangdong